Hermann Josef Ludwig Roth (pseudonym: Antonius R.; author abbreviation: HJR) (b. 2 January 1938 at Montabaur) is a German theologian and scientist, cultural historian and historian of science, educator and monument preservation and nature conservation activist. He is a specialist in the area of mediaeval reform movements and is considered today’s foremost expert on the geography of the Rhineland region and on the life and work of the naturalist, Prince Maximilian of Wied-Neuwied, and his circle.

Education and career 
Hermann Roth was born at Montabaur, Germany, the son of Landrat Heinrich Roth and his wife, Gertrud, née Ebert. From 1957 onwards, having completed his grammar school studies (examinations in advanced Greek, Latin and Hebrew), he initially lived as a Cistercian monk and was enrolled at the Heiligenkreuz Philosophical-Theological Institute (near Vienna). Following ordination as a priest (Frankfurt, 1963) he was active in the youth and community ministries of Marienstatt Abbey and at its grammar school. 

From 1966, he studied biology and chemistry and auxiliary sciences (physics, palaeontology), passed both state examinations for academic teaching qualification (1970, 1972) and taught at a grammar school in Cologne. He assisted from time to time in the parish, youth and aged ministries. In 1991, Cologne‘s regional chief executive appointed Roth head of the advanced education division of the biology department; from 1995, he was director of studies. In 1990, Roth obtained a doctorate in natural sciences from the University of Nijmegen.

Nature 
Having become familiar early on with the natural surroundings of his birthplace, Roth worked toward a systematic registration of the geological and biological features of the Rhineland highlands and contributed to the Floristic Mapping of Central Europe project (1971–1988). He is considered the ”foremost expert on the Westerwald.“ Roth’s comprehensive study of this region called for an interdisciplinary type of enquiry, an approach which he subsequently applied to other topics, as well. A prime example of this is his analysis of the floral architectural sculpture of Gothic monuments (Altenberger Dom, 1976; Cologne Cathedral, 1990) under the aspects of botany and art history, resulting in  “a brilliant documentation” and an “exemplary scholarly interpretation.“   

Generally speaking, Roth’s consistent aim has been to see scientific knowledge in the contexts of intellectual and social history: e.g., evolution in the light of the field of tension between knowledge and belief; ecological theories and ethical postulates versus the variety of ‘natural’ observation.

Since his school days, Roth has been active in the area of nature conservation and has on a pro bono basis held important positions in relevant associations and commissions. For some years, he ran the Biological Station, Bergisches Land. Since 1975, he has been a member of various advisory panels on local geography at both the community and state levels.

Culture 
Roth’s encounter with the Cistercians led to his search for the grave of Otto of Freising (1114–1158) at Morimond (1963). In 1979, Roth founded the international Carthusian Colloquia.   Most recently, he worked toward restoring the popularity of Alanus ab insulis (Alain de Lille, d. 1203), including amongst those outside anthroposophical circles.

Concerning Roth, Peter Finke has concluded that:  Roth’s work as a member of the Research Group for Monastic Medicine at the University of Würzburg (for which he even did research in Brazil) and his contribution to the monastic cultural landscape research programme at the Centre for Garden Art and Landscape Architecture (CGL) of Hannover’s Leibniz University (which centre was established on his own initiative) both exemplify this interdisciplinary approach.

Roth has been elected or appointed to numerous panels, including the Historic Commission for Nassau (since 1978) and the North Rhine-Westphalia Foundation for Nature Conservation and the Local History and Culture of Düsseldorf (1994–2000).

The Americas 
In the Americas, in particular Roth’s activities in the fields of the history of science and monastic medicine have led to close personal and academic connections and, in turn, to several publications.

United States 
Roth’s research into Gothic architectural sculpture and the history and culture of the Cistercians led to invitations from Western Michigan University to participate in the International Congress on Medieval Studies at Kalamazoo, at which event he has delivered several papers.

Roth’s investigations relating to Prince Maximilian of Wied-Neuwied ultimately resulted in the establishment of a relevant project of academic exchange with the Center for Western Studies at the Joslyn Art Museum, Omaha. This in turn led to three journeys in which he retraced stepwise the travel route of Maximilian and Bodmer, with study stays at Philadelphia, Pennsylvania, and New Harmony and St. Louis, Missouri, as well as a side-trip to the Museum of Civilisation at Ottawa. These activities substantially benefited from support from Dr Karl-Heinz Boewe (d. 2013) of the University of Kentucky Libraries, Lexington, and his wife, Joan Lorna Pierce of the Western University of Kentucky.

Mexico 
The original deeds in the archives of Heiligenkreuz Abbey concerning Father Dominik Bilimek (1813–1884), adviser to Ferdinand Maximilian Joseph von Habsburg, Archduke of Austria and Emperor of Mexico (1832–1867), served as the impetus for additional research in Mexico, which included studies at the Biblioteca Nacional de México and at the library and archives of the Dominican Order at Coapa, whose prior, Luis Gabriel Chico Sánchez (†), provided indispensable assistance. Study stays at the historic sites of the Austrian Intervention were followed by supplementary studies relating to the parallel project, monastic medicine, at Puebla.

Brazil 
Brazil was the destination of the first ocean voyage of Prince Maximilian of Wied-Neuwied. This and the natural riches of the country made it excellently suited for both projects. The essential steps of Maximilian’s route were traced. Research into monastic medicine was carried out during stays at the historic monasteries in the coastal towns and at newer establishments in Manaus and Mato Grosso. The costs of the journey were in part borne by pharmaceutical firm Abtei (GSK). Subsequently, study trips were also made to Cabo Verde, Manaus (1999) und Moçambique.

Didactics, journalism and bibliophile activities 
As lecturer, excursion leader and activist in the field of environmental education both at home and abroad, Roth formulated relevant recommendations for the advisory committee of North Rhine-Westphalia’s Executive Landscape Conservation Authority (1998). Roth’s experiences as educator have found expression in such didactic and educational works as On ethics in biology instruction and Earth sciences and biology didactics, the experiment kit for schools Ecology, as well as in publications for a wider readership. As pioneering achievements, his nature guides to the Westerwald and the Guide to nature in Cologne can be mentioned. 

As editor, Roth oversaw the publications Cistercian Chronicles. Forum for Monastic History, Art, Literature and Spirituality., Natural History and Local Geography, Regional Biology and Godesberg Local History and Culture.

Roth played a crucial role in the creation of the Westerwald Landscape Museum at Hachenburg and contributed in an advisory capacity to the preparations for the founding of the LVR Open-Air Museum in Lindlar, North-Rhein-Westphalia. He stimulated the organisation of important exhibitions and contributed to them in an advisory capacity: The Cistercians. Ideal and reality of monastic life , Flora and fauna of the Cologne Cathedral , Maximilian of Wied-Neuwied. Hunter, scholar, traveller ,  900 years Cîteaux – Rhenish Cistercians as revealed in the art of book design , 500 years Brazil – from Rhine to Rio . He contributed to Männerbande – Männerbünde. On the role of men in comparative sociology  and The Cologne Charterhouse ca. 1500 . 

Roth enlarged the family library dedicated to regional geography (Nassovica, Rhenania) and expanded it to include additional subject areas (monastica, Brasiliensia, acta rerum naturalium). Portions of the library, including archived material, have now been acquired by the Montabaur Municipal Archives, Stiftung Naturschutzgeschichte, Biohistoricum Bonn, the Historic Archives of the Archdiocese of Cologne and the Archives of the Diocese of Limburg.

Affiliations 
Roth is active in a number of specialist organisations. He is a founding member of the German Society for the History and Theory of Biology (DGGTB, 1991) and a member of the executive committee of the Natural History Society of the Rhinelands and Westphalia (NHV) and of a number of historical societies and hikers’ clubs.

Awards and honours 
 Scholarship of the Nassauischen Kulturstiftung (1958)
 Appointment at correspondent member of the Dokumentationszentrum Kannenbäckerland, Höhr-Grenzhausen (1976)
 Silver badge of honour of the Deutschen Lebensrettungs-Gesellschaft (DLRG, 1977)
 Albert-Steeger-Stipendium des Landschaftsverbandes Rheinland (1979)
 Umweltschutzmedaille der Deutschen Umweltstiftung (1985)
 Bruno H.-Schubert-Preis (1988)
 Golden badge of honour of the Westerwald-Vereins (1989)
 Rheinlandtaler, Landschaftsverband Rheinland (1998)
 Prize of the Umweltstiftung of the land of Rhineland-Palatinate (2001)
 Bundesverdienstkreuz (2006)
 Certificate of the Gesellschaft für Naturschutz und Ornithologie Rheinland-Pfalz (2003)
 Golden badge of honour of the Verbandes der Deutschen Gebirgs- und Wandervereine (2007)
 Verdienstorden des Landes Nordrhein-Westfalen (2014)
 Membership  Naturhistorischen Verein der Rheinlande und Westfalens, Bonn (2018)
 Botanical honorary taxon: Habenaria hermannjosef-rothii (2020)
2366-0643

Sources 

 Guide to Cistercian scholarship. 2. Ed.: Institute of Cistercian Studies, Western Michigan University. Kalamazoo 1985, p. 125 f.
 Who's Who in the World 1998,15. ed. New Providence/NJ-USA: Marquis, 1997, p. 1207
 American Biographical Institute (Ed.): 1000 Leaders of world influence – o. O. (USA) 2001, p. 389
 Kürschners Deutscher Sachbuch-Kalender 2003/2004. Munich, Leipzig: K.G. Saur, 2004, p. 626 [refer. to p. 935, 949, 967, 970, 980, 994, 996, 998] 
 Who’s Who. 13. ed. Berlin, Wien 2007, p. 766–767, 1 fig.
 
  
 European Almanac of Sholars. Vienna: IDB, 2019, p. 839; 
 Eifeljahrbuch 2019. Hg.: Eifelverein. Düren 2018, p. 18–24;

Publications (choice)

Works as author 
 , Hachenburg
 , 156 p., 379 fig.
 , 294 p., 142 fig.
 , 224 p., 16 fig.
 , 176 p, 158 fig.
 
 , 71 p. for it: Schülerheft. 56 p.
 , 640 p., ca. 70 fig. 
 , 364 p., 143 fig.
 , 202 p.
 , 196 p., 30 fig.
 
 , 10 fig.
 , 48 p.

Publisher/editor 
 , 707 p.
 , 440 p.
 
 
 
 Alte und gefährdete Haustierrassen – Arnsberg: LNU, 2003 - 108 p., –

Audio-visual media/teaching materials 
 Die Zisterzienser. Ordensleben zwischen Ideal und Wirklichkeit - Slideshow with soundtrack, 36 slides, backup 49 p.; ed. with Chrysostomus Schulz - CALIG-Verlag, München 1983
 SVN-Ökologie. Schülerversuchssystem: equipment, chemicals, teachers notes‘, exercise book. Bonn: Prof. Maey, 1986
 Westerwald. Land zwischen Rhein, Lahn und Sieg - Cassette film (50 Min.). arbeda-media Wesseling 1989

Notes

References

External links 
 German National Library: catalogue Hermann Josef Roth on German National Library
 http://www.cist-natur.de
 http://www.zisterzienserlexikon.de/wiki/Hauptseite: Biographia Cisterciensis: Hermann Josef Roth
 http://www.montabaur.de/montabaur/de/STADT%20&%20POLITIK/Stadtgeschichte/Stadtarchiv/ Abt.11.
 http://www.autormobil.de
 http://www.rppd-rlp.de

de:Hermann Josef Roth
fr:Hermann Josef Roth
pt:Hermann Josef Roth

German scientists

1938 births
Living people